Souad Nefissa Cherouati (born 10 February 1989) is an Algerian swimmer. She competed in the women's 1500 metre freestyle event at the 2017 World Aquatics Championships. In 2019, she represented Algeria at the 2019 World Aquatics Championships held in Gwangju, South Korea. She competed in the women's 800 metre freestyle and women's 1500 metre freestyle events. In both events she did not advance to compete in the final.

She competed at the 2020 Summer Olympics in the women's marathon 10 km.

References

External links
 

1989 births
Living people
Algerian female swimmers
Place of birth missing (living people)
Swimmers at the 2015 African Games
Competitors at the 2019 African Games
African Games bronze medalists for Algeria
African Games medalists in swimming
Swimmers at the 2005 Mediterranean Games
Swimmers at the 2013 Mediterranean Games
Algerian female freestyle swimmers
Mediterranean Games competitors for Algeria
Swimmers at the 2020 Summer Olympics
S.L. Benfica (swimming)
21st-century Algerian women
Olympic swimmers of Algeria
Islamic Solidarity Games medalists in swimming
20th-century Algerian women